Romania competed at the 1924 Summer Olympics in Paris, France.  It was the first time that Romania sent a team to compete at the Olympic Games, and the second appearance overall after a lone Romanian athlete competed at the 1900 Summer Olympics. 35 competitors, all men, took part in 7 events in 4 sports.

Medalists

|  style="text-align:left; width:72%; vertical-align:top;"|

| style="text-align:left; width:23%; vertical-align:top;"|

Football

Romania competed in the Olympic football tournament for the first time in 1924.

 Round 1 Did not compete in first round

 Round 2

Final rank 9th place

Rugby union

Romania sent a rugby team to the Olympics for the first time in 1924. The Romanians were defeated handily by each of the two other teams, finishing third in the three-team round-robin and winning bronze medals.

Ranks given are within the pool.

Shooting

Five sport shooters represented Romania in 1924.

Tennis

 Men

References

External links
Official Olympic Reports 
International Olympic Committee results database

Nations at the 1924 Summer Olympics
1924
Oly